The Devil's Apple Tree is a 1929 American silent drama film directed by Elmer Clifton and starring Dorothy Sebastian, Larry Kent and Edward Martindel. It is now considered to be a lost film.

Cast
 Dorothy Sebastian as Dorothy Ryan 
 Larry Kent as John Rice 
 Edward Martindel as Col. Rice 
 Ruth Clifford as Jane Norris 
 George Cooper as Cooper 
 Cosmo Kyrle Bellew as The Roué

References

Bibliography
 Pitts, Michael R. Poverty Row Studios, 1929–1940: An Illustrated History of 55 Independent Film Companies, with a Filmography for Each. McFarland & Company, 2005.

External links

1929 films
1929 drama films
Silent American drama films
Films directed by Elmer Clifton
American silent feature films
1920s English-language films
Tiffany Pictures films
American black-and-white films
Lost American films
1929 lost films
Lost drama films
1920s American films